The Geokchay uezd was a county (uezd) of the Baku Governorate of the Russian Empire and then of the Azerbaijan Democratic Republic and Azerbaijan SSR until its formal abolishment in 1929. The uezd was located in the central part of the governorate, bordering the Kuba uezd to the north, the Shemakha uezd to the east, the Javad uezd to the south and the Elizavetpol Governorate to the west. The administrative center of the uezd was the city of Geokchay (present-day Goychay).

History 
The Geokchay uezd was formed in 1868 as part of the Baku Governorate of the Russian Empire. It was later abolished in 1929 by Soviet authorities during an administrative reorganisation of the region into rayons.

Administrative divisions 
The subcounties (uchastoks) of the Geokchay uezd in 1912 were as follows:

Demographics

Russian Empire Census 
The majority of the population indicated Tatar to be their mother tongue, with significant Armenian and Tat speaking minorities.

Kavkazskiy kalendar 

Soviet census (1926) 
According to the 1926 census, the population of the uezd was 172,851.

Notes

References

Bibliography 

Geographic history of Azerbaijan
States and territories established in 1840
1840 establishments in the Russian Empire
1929 disestablishments in the Soviet Union
Uezds of Baku Governorate
Uezds of the Soviet Union
States and territories disestablished in 1929